Cheshmeh Badir (also Romanized as Cheshmeh Badīr; also known as Cheshmeh Bedar) is a village in Howmeh-ye Gharbi Rural District, in the Central District of Ramhormoz County, Khuzestan Province, Iran. At the 2006 census, its population was 38, in 7 families.

References 

Populated places in Ramhormoz County